Incumbency is one of the most researched and debated topics within the realm of political science. However, the research regarding appointed U.S. senators and the incumbency advantage is not nearly as vast. In this research, the relationship between the number of months served as an appointed U.S. senator and the percentage of the vote that appointed senator receives in their initial election is studied. It is hypothesized that the longer an appointee has served before an election, the higher percentage of the vote that appointee will receive. 

To do this, data was compiled from the United States congressional archives consisting of appointed U.S. senators, the percentage of vote those appointed senators won in their election after their appointment, and the number of months served between their appointment and election. Discovering a relationship between months served and the vote percentages received will add to the scholarship of incumbency, and more specifically, how the discipline of political science views appointed U.S. senators.

Review of literature
Conventional wisdom in the political science community tells us that the largest advantage a U.S. senator has is that of incumbency. This advantage has even been distilled down to a single term: the "incumbency advantage". However, as well studied as the incumbency advantage is of those U.S. senators who are elected, there exists some mystery for those U.S. senators that are appointed. This review will summarize and explain research on the incumbency advantage and its limitations, and how these studies assist in answering questions regarding appointed U.S. senators and incumbency.

Five research studies have been chosen to examine the incumbency advantage. First, David R. Mayhew’s Congressional Elections: The Case of the Vanishing Marginals, which will establish a base of the study of incumbency. Following that research, the review will further focus its lens with two articles authored by Peter Tuckel, titled Length of Incumbency And the Reelection chances of U.S. Senators and The Initial Re-Election Chances of Appointed & Elected United States Senators, respectively. Finally, Treadmill to Oblivion: The Fate of Appointed Senators, which is authored by William D. Morris and Rodger H. Marz, and The Electoral (Mis)Fortunes of Appointed Senators and the Source of the Incumbency Advantage, written by Jennifer A. Steen and Jonathan Koppell will close out the review.

Mayhew
In Mayhew's Congressional Elections: The Case of the Vanishing Marginals, Mayhew compiled House seat swing data between the years of 1956 to 1972 .  In his research, he explained, "The House seat swing is a phenomenon of fast declining amplitude and therefore of fast declining significance."  Mayhew asks whether House members are getting more of a benefit from federal programs. Mayhew notes, "The number of grant-in-aid programs has risen in the last decade…"  Mayhew also posits that House members have become more skilled at taking positions on issues, arguing that this is possibly due to an increase in polling technology and resources.

Mayhew's study appropriately relates to the research question by explaining how incumbency becomes an advantage. Mayhew's research gives an introduction to a prominent hypothesis regarding the incumbency advantage: that experience and time served are some of the most important characteristics of an incumbency advantage

Tuckel
Peter Tuckel examines the pattern of incumbency in his research, Length of Incumbency and the Reelection Chances of U.S. Senators and The Initial Re-Election Chances of Appointed & Elected United States Senators. In his studies, Tuckel examined the relationship between the length of incumbency for appointed U.S. senators and found that "only 24 percent of appointed senators are retained in office compared to 65.4 percent of the elected senators."  Even when removing appointed incumbents who relinquish their role voluntarily, Tuckel notes that only “56.5 percent of appointees win on election day compared to 76 percent of elected office holders."  Upon doing so, Tuckel concludes  that "(Appointed Senators) are considerably less successful in gaining re-election than are the specially-elected incumbents…Moreover, appointed senators who serve for twelve months or less actually do better than those who serve between thirteen and twenty-six months." Tuckel suggests that the reason for the difference in electoral chances for appointed senators compared to incumbent senators is the amount of experience present in the two.

Tuckel's research provides useful information regarding the question of the incumbency advantage with appointed U.S. senators. His research allows for a more focused research question examining the relationship between length served and election rate for appointed senators.

Morris and Marz
William D. Morris and Roger H. Marz's Treadmill to Oblivion: The Fate of Appointed Senators is a thorough and in-depth review of the careers of appointed senators, an issue brought up by Peter Tuckel in his research, The Initial Reelection Chances of Appointed & Elected United States Senators. Throughout their research, Morris and Marz bring to attention some interesting questions. The authors argue the concept of "illegitimacy," a disposition that voters experience towards senators that are appointed. Morris and Marz write, "the survival rate of appointed senators who seek to hold their seats suggests the voting public considers them "illegitimate" in the social psychological sense."  The authors go on to argue that this "suggests the mantle of office protecting "normal" incumbents does not fully cover the appointee."

Morris and Marz also analyze the relationship between the political backgrounds that appointees have and their reelection rate.  In their analysis, an interesting statistic arises: out of the seventeen private citizens that have been appointed to the United States Senate, eight chose to not to seek reelection, while nine chose to. Of those nine that ran, none won their reelection bids.  Furthermore, Morris and Marz discover that “In 81 percent of the cases where an appointed incumbent was defeated, the opposition candidate has a higher status of previous political experience.”

The authors conclude that the Senate appointees cannot establish a vibrant reelection effort while being bogged down with committee work and the "norms of conduct and courtesy which apply to all newcomers…The appointee, then, is given very little opportunity to perform those services so basic to their chances at reelection during the first session of Congress. In addition, "the appointee returns home to find himself locked in political combat with a far more experienced opponent."  Morris and Marz's research presents some possible explanations for a lower than typical appointee election rate, adding to a list of additional independent variables regarding the research question.

Steen and Koppell
In Jennifer A. Steen and Jonathan Koppell's research titled, The Electoral (Mis)Fortunes of Appointed Senators and the Source of Incumbency Advantage, the authors attempt to "disentangle the power of holding office from the advantages that are accrued through or are indicated by winning office in the first place."  Steen and Koppell hypothesize that there are two factors to the incumbency advantage that are overlooked. First, "that incumbents attain re-election because of qualities they possessed before they became incumbents."

Next, the authors argue that an incumbent gains certain qualities by his or her own candidacy, and that the incumbent is given the ability to hone and tend to the skills and connections needed to be successful.

Essentially, Steen and Koppell are arguing that holding the office doesn't have as much to do with the incumbency advantage as previously thought, but "rather the political resources accrued during the previous election and the electoral strength indicated by the initial victory contribute significantly to the re-election success of incumbents."  Paying homage to Morris and Marz, Steen and Koppell also suggest, regarding appointed senators and their reelection rates that "It could be that the undemocratic nature of these senators' election is actually a disadvantage when the candidate must go before the electorate."

Steen and Koppell's research is the most current, and is a great reference in answering the research question. The authors' data was the most current of any of the authors reviewed, and allows for a more thorough sifting of data.

David Mayhew's research offered a foundation for incumbency, as Peter Tuckel introduced the incumbency advantage to the United States Senate, and offered explanatory suggestions of possible alternatives to the advantages gained by simply becoming a U.S. senator. William Morris and Roger Marz analyze differences in political experience between appointed senators and their challengers, the complications of running a reelection effort an appointed senator would face. Finally, Jennifer Steen and Jonathan Koppell argue that incumbency is more about the candidate and his or her skills, than about the advantages obtained in office, channeling Tuckel.

Sources

Journals and reports
Mayhew, David R., "Congressional Elections: The Case of the Vanishing Marginals." Polity 6.3 (1974): 295–317. 
Morris, William D., and Roger H. Marz. "Treadmill to Oblivion: The Fate of Appointed Senators." Publius 11.1 (1981): 65–80. 
Steen, Jennifer A., and Jonathan GS Koppell. "The Electoral (Mis)Fortunes of Appointed Senators and the Source of Incumbency Advantage." Yale School of Management: 1-32. 
Tuckel, Peter. "Length of Incumbency and the Reelection Chances of U.S. Senators." Legislative Studies Quarterly 8.2 (1983): 283–88. 
Tuckel, Peter. "The Initial Re-Election Chances of Appointed & Elected United States Senators." Polity 16.1 (1983): 138–42.

Databases
Office of the Clerk of the U.S. House of Representatives. Web. 03 Mar. 2011. .
"Art & History Home People Senators Appointed Senators." U.S. Senate. Web. 23 Dec. 2010. .

Election campaigning